Krishna Kumar Chaudhary was an Indian politician from Bihar who represented Gaya in the Lok Sabha from 1998 to 1999.

References 

India MPs 1998–1999
Bharatiya Janata Party politicians from Bihar
1962 births
Lok Sabha members from Bihar
Living people